Françoise Filastre, also known as La Filastre (1645–1680), was a French poisoner and occultist, one of the many involved in l'affaire des Poisons. In her testimony she named the king's mistress, Madame de Montespan as another participant in the scandal.

She first came to police attention in 1677 as a practician of occult magic with renegade priests, associated with Louis de Vanens, and La Voisin. and provided aphrodisiac on her orders for Madame de Montespan, who used it to drug Louis XIV of France. In 1679, Montespan hired La Voisin to murder the monarch and his latest love interest Marie-Angelique, Duchesse de Fontanges. When the plans failed due to the arrest of La Voisin, Montespan hired Filastre to perform the murder on Fontanges. She was arrested in December 1679, after having applied for a position in the household of Fontanges.

In August 1680, after the execution of La Voisin in February, the connection between La Voisin and Montespan and the plan to assassinate the king was revealed by her daughter Marguerite Monvoisin, who on 9 October also confirmed the August statements by Adam Lesage of child sacrifice at the black masses. On 30 September the Chambre Ardente, acting on the evidence given, condemned Filastre to death, before which she was to be subjected to further intensive interrogation of "the extraordinary question". On 31 September she confirmed her participation in a Black Mass, and stated that others, not yet tried or convicted, had performed spells for Montespan. Under torture the next day, she then claimed that Montespan had wanted Fontanges poisoned, which was why she had attempted to gain employment with the duchess. After being taken back to her cell, Filastre requested an interview with La Reynie, chief of police, in which she recanted her previous testimony, saying she wanted end the pain, but that she did not want to die with a lie on her conscience. 

She was burnt to death at the Place de Greve in Paris.

To prevent Filastre's testimony being read aloud in court, Louis XIV suspended public hearings of the Chambre Ardente.

References 

 Frantz Funck-Brentano: Princes and Poisoners Or Studies of the Court of Louis XIV
 H Noel Williams: Madame de Montespan and Louis XIV
 Anne Somerset - The Affair of the Poisons: Murder, Infanticide, and Satanism at the Court of Louis XIV (St. Martin's Press (October 12, 2003) )
 Arlette Lebigre: 1679-1682, l'affaire des poisons

1640s births
1680 deaths
1679 crimes
French occultists
Poisoners
French people executed for witchcraft
17th-century executions by France
Executed French women
People executed by France by burning
17th-century occultists
17th-century French businesspeople
Affair of the Poisons